The Saskatchewan Liquor and Gaming Authority (or SLGA) is a Treasury Board crown corporation responsible for the distribution, control and regulation of alcoholic beverages, cannabis and most gambling in the Canadian province of Saskatchewan. Its head office is located in Regina.

SLGA is the main distributor of and sole licensing agent for the sale of beverage alcohol in Saskatchewan. It owns and manages all video lottery terminals located in liquor permitted establishments in approximately 300 communities around the province and owns and manages the slot machines at seven casinos operated by the Saskatchewan Indian Gaming Authority (SIGA).

SLGA also licenses and regulates most forms of gambling: bingos, raffles, casinos, breakopen tickets, poker events, monte carlo events and horse racing. The agency also regulates Sask Gaming, the crown corporation responsible for Casino Regina and Casino Moose Jaw.

SLGA operates a network of retail liquor stores in communities around Saskatchewan. In November 2015, prior to the 2016 provincial election, the Saskatchewan Party government announced plans to privatize at least 40 of the 75 liquor stores the SLGA ran, but that these plans would not be realized until after the election. In November 2016, it was announced that 39 stores would be privatized and sold to various owners, and that 11 new private stores would be authorized. Their new owners include co-operatives, entrepreneurs, and commercial companies such as Sobeys. 

On October 26, 2022, it was announced that the SLGA would exit the retail market and privatize all other liquor stores in the province, while maintaining a wholesale role. Furthermore, it was announced that a new crown corporation known as Lotteries and Gaming Saskatchewan (LGS) would assume the role of managing and/or overseeing lotteries (in association with Sask Sport and the WCLC), casinos (owning Sask Gaming and overseeing the SIGA), VLTs, and internet gambling in the province effective April 1, 2023, with the SLGA taking on a role as an "independent regulator" and continuing to oversee charitable gaming.

References

External links
Saskatchewan Liquor and Gaming Authority
Problem gambling - Saskatchewan Questions and Answers (Centre for Addiction and Mental Health)

Alcohol monopolies
Canadian provincial alcohol departments and agencies
Crown corporations of Saskatchewan
Companies based in Regina, Saskatchewan
Alcohol distribution retailers of Canada
Alcohol in Saskatchewan